The International Geography Olympiad (iGeo) is an annual competition for 16- to 19-year-old geography students from all over the world. Students chosen to represent their countries are some of the best, chosen from thousands of students who participate enthusiastically in their own National Geography Olympiads. iGeo tests the abilities of every participant in spatial patterns and processes. The iGeo consists of three parts: a written test, a multimedia test and a substantial fieldwork exercise requiring observation, leading to cartographic representation and geographical analysis. The programme also includes poster presentations by teams, cultural exchanges, and time for students to know their fellow students and explore the host city.

The International Geography Olympiad is organised by the International Geographical Union (IGU) Olympiad Task Force, who produce tests with reference to the local organisers and the international board.

After the first iGeo in 1996, it was recommended that the competition was held biennially. Due to the competition growing in popularity, since 2012 the competition has been held annually, rather than biennially, as is the case with the other large International Science Olympiads.

History of competition and national success 

During the 1994 Congress of the International Geographical Union (IGU) in Prague, people from Poland and the Netherlands launched the idea of an International Geography Competition (iGeo) or Olympiad for students between 15 and 19 years of age. The first one was held in 1996 in The Hague, Netherlands, with five participating countries. The participant count grew to 24 countries with the 2008 competition in Carthage, Tunisia.

Before 2012, the International Science Olympiads were held every two years, and some regional geography Olympiads were held during intervening years. These include the Asia Pacific Regional Geography Olympiads (APRGO), which were held in 2007 (Hsinchu, Taiwan), 2009 (Tsukuba, Japan), and 2011 (Merida, Mexico), and the Central European Regional Geography Olympiads (CERIGEO). Since 2013, the International Geography Olympiad, in concordance with the other Olympiads, has been held on a yearly basis.

Due to the COVID-19 pandemic, the 2020 iGeo in Istanbul, Turkey was postponed. The Olympiad was held in Istanbul between 11 and 15 August the following year, with 46 countries participating. The next Olympiad is to be held in Paris, France in July 2022.

Member countries and regions 
The participating countries and regions in the 2021 International Geography Olympiad are:

 China-Beijing
 China-Hong Kong
 Taiwan

The full list of participating teams for all past iGeos may be found on the iGeo website.

Summary

Performances

Best nations by podium finishes (all time)

Most national individual victories (All time)

References

External links 
 

International Science Olympiad
Geography education